Macropsychanthus grandiflorus is a species of legume native to South America (Bolivia and Brazil). The seeds of Macropsychanthus grandiflorus contain a well-characterized lectin named DGL which is similar to other legume lectins.

See also
ConA

References

Faboideae